Ignacio Sarabia Díaz (born 15 July 1983) is a Mexican racing cyclist, who currently rides for Mexican amateur team .

Major results

Track

2002
 3rd  Team pursuit, Pan American Track Championships
 3rd  Team pursuit, Central American and Caribbean Games
2010
 Central American and Caribbean Games
2nd  Madison
3rd  Team pursuit
2014
 Central American and Caribbean Games
2nd  Omnium
2nd  Team pursuit
2018
 Central American and Caribbean Games
1st  Madison
1st  Points race
1st  Team pursuit
 Pan American Track Championships
2nd  Madison
3rd  Team pursuit
2019
 Pan American Track Championships
1st  Madison
2nd  Points race

Road

2007
 8th Overall Circuito Montañés
2008
 6th Circuito de Getxo
 9th Overall Troféu Joaquim Agostinho
 9th Overall Vuelta Mexico Telmex
 9th Subida a Urkiola
2009
 1st  Time trial, National Road Championships
 4th Overall Vuelta Mexico Telmex
2010
 2nd Time trial, National Road Championships
 5th Overall Vuelta Mexico Telmex
1st Stages 3 & 6
 7th Time trial, Pan American Road Championships
2011
 1st Stage 2 Vuelta a Boyacá
2012
 Ruta del Centro
1st Stages 5, 6 & 8
2013
 1st Points classification Ruta del Centro
 Pan American Road Championships
2nd  Road race
2nd  Time trial
2014
 National Road Championships
1st  Road race
3rd Time trial
2015
 1st Stage 2 Vuelta Mexico Telmex
 2nd Road race, National Road Championships
2018
 1st Stage 8a Tour de Guadeloupe
2021
 4th Road race, National Road Championships

References

External links

1983 births
Living people
Mexican male cyclists
Cyclists at the 2003 Pan American Games
Cyclists at the 2011 Pan American Games
Cyclists at the 2015 Pan American Games
Cyclists at the 2019 Pan American Games
Central American and Caribbean Games gold medalists for Mexico
Central American and Caribbean Games silver medalists for Mexico
Central American and Caribbean Games bronze medalists for Mexico
Competitors at the 2002 Central American and Caribbean Games
Competitors at the 2010 Central American and Caribbean Games
Competitors at the 2014 Central American and Caribbean Games
Competitors at the 2018 Central American and Caribbean Games
Central American and Caribbean Games medalists in cycling
Pan American Games competitors for Mexico
21st-century Mexican people